The Fraser Coast Region is a local government area in the Wide Bay–Burnett region of Queensland, Australia, about  north of Brisbane, the state capital. It is centred on the twin cities of Hervey Bay and Maryborough and also contains Fraser Island. It was created in 2008 from a merger of the Cities of Maryborough and Hervey Bay and the Shires of Woocoo and most of Tiaro. In June 2018 it had a population of 105,463.

The 2021-2022 budget of the Fraser Coast Regional Council is A$387 million.

History 
Butchulla (also known as Batjala, Badtjala, Badjela and Badjala) is the language of the Fraser Coast region, including Fraser Island. Butchulla language region includes the landscape within the local government boundaries of the Fraser Coast Regional Council, particularly the towns of Maryborough and Hervey Bay extending south towards Noosa and north to Howard.

Prior to the 2008 amalgamation, the Fraser Coast Region existed as four distinct local government areas:

 the City of Hervey Bay;
 the City of Maryborough;
 the Shire of Woocoo;
 and Divisions 1 & 2 of the Shire of Tiaro.

On 10 March 1861, the Municipal Borough of Maryborough, governed under the Municipalities Act 1858 which had been inherited from New South Wales upon the separation of Queensland in 1859, was proclaimed, becoming the sixth municipal government in Queensland. Henry Palmer was appointed as its first Mayor.

On 11 November 1879, when the Divisional Boards Act 1879 came into effect, the Antigua and Burrum Divisions were created around what is now Hervey Bay, and on 15 September 1883, the Granville Division was established to serve the district surrounding Maryborough. A later division, Howard, was split away from the Division of Isis in 1900.

With the passage of the Local Authorities Act 1902, all four divisions became Shires on 31 March 1903, and Maryborough became a Town. On 7 January 1905 Maryborough achieved City status, and a Town Hall was built on the corner of Kent and Adelaide Streets and became the administrative centre of the City.

At around this time, the Shire of Degilbo, later renamed Biggenden, split away on 3 June 1905. On 23 December 1905, Burrum was renamed Pialba.

On 17 February 1917, the Granville, Antigua and Pialba shires were dissolved, and split between a new Shire of Burrum and the Shire of Woocoo, which had been gazetted three years earlier. By the 1920s the Hervey Bay area was rapidly expanding due to continuing growth in the primary industries such as sugar cane, citrus, pineapples, beef cattle and fishing, as well as investment in transport infrastructure. In the 1950s and 1960s, population and development increased, and the coastal towns slowly merged into a single urban area.

On 20 December 1975, but effective from 27 March 1976 local government elections, the Shire of Burrum was renamed the Shire of Hervey Bay. With the new focus on the coastal region,  of its area, with an estimated population of 1,119, was annexed by the City of Maryborough, while  with an estimated population of 2,629 was annexed by the Shire of Woocoo.

In September 1977, the Shire of Hervey Bay received Town status, and on 18 February 1984 it became a City.

At this time, Maryborough was resubdivided into eight divisions each with one councillor, plus an elected mayor.

On 15 March 2008, under the Local Government (Reform Implementation) Act 2007 passed by the Parliament of Queensland on 10 August 2007, the City of Hervey Bay merged with the City of Maryborough, Shire of Woocoo and part of Tiaro to form the Fraser Coast Region.

Wards
The council consists of ten councillors and a mayor, elected for a four-year term. Each of the councillors represent one of the ten divisions.

Towns and localities
The Fraser Coast Region includes the following settlements:

Urban Hervey Bay:
 Booral
 Bunya Creek
 Craignish
 Dundowran
 Dundowran Beach
 Eli Waters
 Kawungan
 Nikenbah
 Pialba
 Point Vernon
 Scarness
 Sunshine Acres
 Susan River
 Takura
 Toogoom
 Torquay
 Urangan
 Urraween
 Walligan
 Wondunna

Rural Hervey Bay:
 Beelbi Creek
 Burgowan
 Burrum
 Burrum Heads
 Burrum River
 Burrum Town
 Cherwell
 Dundathu
 Howard
 Pacific Haven
 River Heads
 Torbanlea
 Walliebum

Maryborough area:
 Maryborough
 Granville
 Island Plantation
 Maryborough West
 Aldershot
 Beaver Rock
 Bidwill
 Boonooroo
 Boonooroo Plains
 Duckinwilla 
 Eurong (Fraser Island)
 Ferney
 Glenorchy
 Great Sandy Strait
 Maaroom
 Poona
 Poona National Park
 St Helens
 Teddington
 The Dimonds
 Tinana
 Tuan
 Tuan Forest
 Walkers Point

Woocoo area:
 Antigua
 Aramara
 Bidwill
 Boompa
 Brooweena
 Dunmora
 Grahams Creek
 Mungar
 Oakhurst
 Owanyilla
 Tinana South
 Woocoo
 Yengarie
 Yerra

North Tiaro - Division 1 area:
 Tiaro
 Blackmount
 Pioneers Rest
 St Mary
 Thinoomba

North Tiaro - Division 2 area:
 Bauple
 Bauple Forest
 Glenbar
 Glenwood
 Gootchie
 Gundiah
 Kanigan
 Mount Urah
 Munna Creek
 Neerdie
 Netherby
 Paterson
 Talegalla Weir
 Tin Can Bay1
 Tinnanbar

1 - split with Gympie Region

Libraries 
The Fraser Coast Regional Council operates public libraries at Burrum Heads, Pialba (Hervey Bay), Howard, Maryborough (John Anderson), Maryborough (Toys and Special Needs), and Tiaro (Tom Gee Memorial).

Population
The populations given relate to the component entities prior to 2008. The 2011 census was the first for the new Region.

Current Councillors/Mayor 
The current mayor of the Fraser Coast Regional Council is George Seymour elected in a by-election held in May 2018 and re-elected in 2020. The by-election followed the dismissal of Chris Loft as Mayor on 16 February 2018 by the Minister for Local Government, Stirling Hinchliffe who alleged Mr Loft made "serial breaches of the Local Government principles outlined in the Local Government Act."

As at 2020, the councillors are:

 Cr James Hansen
 Cr Phil Truscott
 Cr Paul Truscott
 Cr Daniel Sanderson
 Cr Jade Wellings
 Cr David Lewis
 Cr Darren Everard
 Cr Denis Chapman
 Cr David Lee
 Cr Zane O'Keefe

List of mayors 
 2008–2012: Mick Kruger
 2012–2016: Gerard Daniel O'Connell
 2016–2018 (dismissed):  Chris Loft
 2018–present: George Seymour

See also
Great Sandy Biosphere Reserve

References

External links
 Fraser Coast Regional Council Website
Local Government & Municipal Knowledge Base – Fraser Coast Regional Council Page

 
Local government areas of Queensland
Wide Bay–Burnett
2008 establishments in Australia